The 2013 Copa de España de Fútbol Sala was the 24th staging of the Copa de España de Fútbol Sala. It took place in the Pabellón Caja Madrid for up to 4,500 seats, in Alcalá de Henares, Spain, between 21 and 24 February 2013. The tournament was hosted by LNFS and the Alcalá de Henares city council. Inter Movistar was the host team.

FC Barcelona Intersport won its third title in a row after defeating ElPozo Murcia 4–2 in the final.

Qualified teams
The qualified teams were the eight first teams on standings at midseason.

Venue

Matches

Quarter-finals

Semi-finals

Final

Top 5 goalscorers

Source: own compilation

See also
2012–13 Primera División de Futsal
2012–13 Copa del Rey de Futsal

References

External links
Official website

Copa de España de Futsal seasons
Espana
Futsal